Rita Cucchiara (born 1965) is an Italian electrical and computer engineer, and professor of computer architecture and computer vision in the Enzo Ferrari Department of Engineering at the University of Modena and Reggio Emilia (UNIMORE) in Italy. Cucchiara's work focuses on artificial intelligence, specifically deep network technologies and computer vision to human behavior understanding (HBU). She is the director of the AImage Lab at UNIMORE and is director of the Artificial Intelligence Research and Innovation Center (AIRI) as well as the ELLIS (European Labs of Learning and Intelligent Systems) Unit at Modena. She was founder and director from 2018 to 2021 of the Italian National Lab of Artificial Intelligence and intelligent systems of CINI.  Cucchiara was also president of the CVPL GIRPR the Italian Association of Computer Vision, Machine Learning and Pattern Recognition from 2016 to 2018.

Early life and education 
Cucchiara was born in Italy in 1965. She received her diploma in classical studies at Liceo Classico "San Carlo" in Modena, Italy in 1983 and then pursued her undergraduate education at the University of Bologna. She majored in electronic engineering and graduated magna cum laude in 1989. Following her undergraduate degree, Cucchiara pursued her graduate work at the University of Bologna, specializing in Computer Engineering and Parallel Architectures for Computer Vision. Her work focused on genetic models for the clustering problem in Image Analysis. Cluster analysis is important for object separation and identification, and is used to transform objects from the real image space to an n-dimensional feature space in order to find similarities between objects and group them. She addressed limitations to existing clustering in image analysis using a stochastic computational model which seeks the optimal solution to an object function. This algorithm is termed the Genetic Algorithm because of its similarity to evolution, where good solutions have higher "fitness" and are reproduced in order to achieve the most optimal object segmentation.

Cucchiara completed her PhD in 1992 and then became a research assistant at the University of Ferrara from 1993 until 1998. Her research here focused on building algorithms for shape and object detection for use in detecting fabrication defects. She used Gradient-based Hough Transform in order to detect shapes amidst both structured and unstructured noise. Cucchiara further developed a novel machine learning approach for features selection and shape detection where data-driven hypotheses are first generated about the presence of a target shape, and then a classifier is defined by a machine learning algorithm validates these hypotheses, such that learning is used both in defining the description language as well as the for defining the model.

Career and research 
Cucchiara became an associate professor of computer architecture and computer vision in the Enzo Ferrari Department of Computer Science and Engineering at the University of Modena and Reggio Emilia (UNIMORE) in Italy in 1998. In 2005, she was promoted to Full Professor. Cucchiara has many leadership roles in UNIMORE including being the Dean of Regional Industrial Research Platform in Emilia Romagna from 2012 to 2016, and the Director of the Masters Program in Visual Computing and Multimedia Technology. Cucchiara is also Director of the AImage Lab, leading projects in areas such as autonomous robotics, deep learning for video surveillance, human behavioral analysis, and human-car interactions, computer vision and patterns recognition.

Outside of UNIMORE, Cucchiara leads several nationwide groups in Italy centered around Artificial Intelligence and Deep Learning. In 2016, she was elected President of the Italian Association of Pattern Recognition, Learning and Computer vision GIRPR (Gruppo di ricercatori italiani in pattern recognition) then renamed in CVPL Computer Vision, Pattern Recognition and Machine Learning Association. In 2015 she became an advisory board member of the Computer Vision Foundation. She has also been director of the CINI National Lab in Artificial Intelligence and Intelligent Systems. from 2018 to 2021.
Since 2020 she is responsible of the NVIDIA AI TechicalCenter in Modena and director of the ELLIS unit of Modena in the network of European Labs in Learning and Intelligent Systems. Since 2021 Cucchiara is director of the Artificial Intelligence Research and Innovation Center (AIRI).

Human behavior understanding 
Human behavior understanding (HBU) is a large focus of Cucchiara's research. HBU can be used for crowd surveillance and security. As such, Cucchiara has focused on using multiple camera tracking and supervised clustering to analyze crowds of people. She applied a structural support vector machine classifier learns similarities for groups of people based on inter- and intra- camera feature detection. Using the DukeMTMC-Groups dataset, they completed the first ever experiment to test group tracking within and across cameras.

Cucchiara's team has also explored the use of depth cameras to estimate head and shoulder position of humans in images. The core framework of the technique was a Convolutional Neural Network called POSEidon+ which takes three images as an input and outputs the 3D pose angles. The model was also able to hallucinate faces from depth images. They tested their algorithm on publicly available datasets and it was able to outcompete existing algorithms, performing at 30 frames per second.

Another innovation that Cucchiara and her colleagues have pioneered is the development of a novel algorithm for head pose estimation based on ego-vision from head mounted cameras as interactions and social behavior are related to the perspectives of the individuals in the social interaction. Using supervised clustering and a structural SVM they were able to obtain head pose and 3D people estimation using first-person videos.

Video surveillance 
Cucchiara has developed novel methods and tools for video surveillance, and as such has pioneered the creation of an open platform called ViSOR (Video Surveillance Online Repository) to enable sharing, annotating, and retrieval of videos for surveillance as well as performance of automatic surveillance detection methods.

Adversarial neural networks and hallucination 
An extension and recent innovation to Cucchiara's work explores the ability of applying deep learning architectures to identify and classify information that is incomplete or missing, such as when a person is occluded by other people or objects in a crowd. Cucchiara and her team were able to integrate U-nets and GANs to develop a novel architecture that is able to "hallucinate" complete people shapes even when the person is occluded.

COVID-19 social distance tracking through AI 
Since the beginning of the COVID-19 pandemic, Cucchiara has been modifying and applying her innovations to help with pandemic. Cucchiara and her team had previously designed a tool that was able to use artificial intelligence to measure the space between people in a crowd for surveillance, but she had now been adapting this tool to measure and enforce social distancing regulations in lines, doorways, and other public spaces. Her project is called "Inter-Homines", and is uses AI to geometrically verify that citizens are maintaining social distancing measures in public spaces. The technology will generate a warning message when people come within 2.4m of each other. Her work is aimed at ensuring that citizens of Italy, one of the first countries to experience a major outbreak, are continuing to strictly enforce distancing measures as the pandemic continues.

Awards and honors 

 2021 In the 2021 List of Leading Academic Data Leaders from CDO magazine.
 2020 General Chair of ICPR2020
 2018 Women in Robotics You Need To Know - Robohub
 2018 Maria Petrou Prize of IAPR
 2016 Facebook Artificial intelligence Research grant
 2016 Cineca Italian SuperComputing Resource Allocation grant

Select media 
 2019 TEDxOrtygia, "AI and Human Beings"
 2017 TEDxModenaSalon "The Future of Visual Intelligence"

Select publications 
 Cornia, Marcella; Stefanini, Matteo; Baraldi, Lorenzo; Corsini, Massimiliano; Cucchiara, Rita "Explaining Digital Humanities by Aligning Images and Textual Descriptions" PATTERN RECOGNITION LETTERS, vol. 129, pp. 166–172, 2020
 Borghi, Guido; Pini, Stefano; Vezzani, Roberto; Cucchiara, Rita "Driver Face Verification with Depth Maps" SENSORS, pp. 19–3361, 2019
 Fulgeri, F.; Fabbri, Matteo; Alletto, Stefano; Calderara, S.; Cucchiara, R. "Can adversarial networks hallucinate occluded people with a plausible aspect?" COMPUTER VISION AND IMAGE UNDERSTANDING, vol. 182, pp. 71–80, 2019 | DOI: 10.1016/j.cviu.2019.03.007
 Borghi, Guido; Fabbri, Matteo; Vezzani, Roberto; Calderara, Simone; Cucchiara, Rita "Face-from-Depth for Head Pose Estimation on Depth Images" IEEE TRANSACTIONS ON PATTERN ANALYSIS AND MACHINE INTELLIGENCE, pp. 1–1, 2018 | DOI: 10.1109/TPAMI.2018.2885472 
 Baraldi, Lorenzo; Grana, Costantino; Cucchiara, Rita "Recognizing and Presenting the Storytelling Video Structure with Deep Multimodal Networks" IEEE TRANSACTIONS ON MULTIMEDIA, vol. 19, pp. 955–968, 2017 | DOI: 10.1109/TMM.2016.2644872
 Solera, Francesco; Calderara, Simone; Ristani, Ergys; Tomasi, Carlo; Cucchiara, Rita "Tracking social groups within and across cameras" IEEE TRANSACTIONS ON CIRCUITS AND SYSTEMS FOR VIDEO TECHNOLOGY, vol. 27, pp. 441–453, 2017 | DOI: 10.1109/TCSVT.2016.2607378 
 Alletto, Stefano; Abati, Davide; Serra, Giuseppe; Cucchiara, Rita "Exploring Architectural Details Through aWearable Egocentric Vision Device" SENSORS, vol. 16(2), pp. 1–15, 2016 | DOI: 10.3390/s16020237 
 Alletto, Stefano; Serra, Giuseppe; Calderara, Simone; Cucchiara, Rita "Understanding social relationships in egocentric vision" PATTERN RECOGNITION, vol. 48, pp. 4082–4096, 2015 | DOI: 10.1016/j.patcog.2015.06.006 
 Piccinini, P.; Gamberini, Rita; Prati, A.; Rimini, Bianca; Cucchiara, Rita "AN AUTOMATED PICKING WORKSTATION FOR HEALTHCARE APPLICATIONS" COMPUTERS & INDUSTRIAL ENGINEERING, vol. 64, pp. 653–668, 2013 | DOI: 10.1016/j.cie.2012.11.004
 Calderara, Simone; Cucchiara, Rita; Prati, Andrea "Bayesian-competitive Consistent Labeling for People Surveillance" IEEE TRANSACTIONS ON PATTERN ANALYSIS AND MACHINE INTELLIGENCE, vol. 30, pp. 354–360, 2008 | DOI: 10.1109/TPAMI.2007.70814
 Cucchiara, Rita "Genetic algorithms for clustering in machine vision" MACHINE VISION AND APPLICATIONS, vol. 11(1), pp. 1–6, 1998

External links 
AIRI
ELLIS

References 

Italian women scientists
Italian women engineers
University of Bologna alumni
University of Ferrara alumni
1965 births
Living people
Academic staff of the University of Modena and Reggio Emilia